The Municipal President of Merida (or Mayor of Merida in a colloquial sense, because in Mexico the term mayor is not considered as legitimate) is the person who presides the City Council of the Mérida Municipality and the head-government of the municipality of Mérida, which includes the city of Merida and its towns inside the municipality. The mayor is elected for a three-year term limited to serve one more term, after the 2015 constitutional reform. The mayor's office is seated at the Municipal Palace (or City Hall), located at downtown Mérida City.

List of the municipal presidents of Mérida 
List of recent mayors of Mérida, Yucatán:

*Based on the Official Chronology of Municipal Presidents

**AM = Acting Mayor

See also
Municipality of Mérida

References 

Government of Yucatán
merida
Politicians from Yucatán (state)